Khaled Al-Sarayra is a Jordanian field marshal who held the post of Chairman of the Joint Chiefs of Staff of the Jordanian Armed Forces from 5 April 1993 to 18 July 1999 
Date of death 11/18/2020.

References

Jordanian field marshals
20th-century Jordanian people